Filip Socek (born December 31, 1982) is a Serbian basketball coach and former player.

Playing career 
Socek was professional basketball player who played for his hometown team Vojvodina and for Montenegrin teams Mogren and Ulcinj. He finished his playing career with Mladost Bački Jarak in 2009.

Coaching career 
Socek was a coach head coach of Mladost Bački Jarak and Meridiana. He won the Serbian B League in 2012–13 season with Meridiana.

He was an assistant coach for Serbia men's national under-16 basketball team which won a silver medal at the 2013 FIBA Europe Under-16 Championship.

Prior to the 2014–15 season, Socek became a head coach for the Spartak Subotica. In January 2015, Socek was named as a head coach for the Vojvodina. He left Vojvodina after the 2018–19 season. In November 2019, he signed for Vojvodina. He left the club after in June 2020.

On 16 November 2020, Socek was hired as the new head coach of Pirot. Prior to the 2021–22 2MLS season, Spartak Subotica hired him as their new head coach. Spartak fired him in November 2021. On 21 February 2022, Radnički Kragujevac hired Socek as their new head coach.

Career achievements and awards 
 Serbian B League champion: 1 (with Meridiana: 2012–13)
 AP Vojvodina Coach of the Year: 2017

References

External links
 Coach Profile at eurobasket.com
 Player Profile at eurobasket.com

1982 births
Living people
KK Meridiana coaches
KK Vojvodina coaches
KK Pirot coaches
KK Spartak Subotica coaches
KK Vojvodina players
KKK Radnički coaches
Serbian men's basketball coaches
Serbian expatriate basketball people in Montenegro
Serbian men's basketball players
Serbian people of Hungarian descent
Basketball players from Novi Sad
Guards (basketball)